Chrysanthemum vulgare can refer to:

Chrysanthemum vulgare (L.) Bernh., a synonym of Tanacetum vulgare L., tansy
Chrysanthemum vulgare (Lam.) Gaterau, a synonym of Leucanthemum vulgare subsp. vulgare Lam., ox-eye daisy